WRNJ (1510 kHz) is a commercial AM/FM radio station in Hackettstown, New Jersey.  It broadcasts an adult contemporary radio format and is owned locally by WRNJ Radio, Inc.

By day, WRNJ is powered at 2,000 watts.  But because AM 1510 is a clear channel frequency reserved for Class A WLAC in Nashville, WRNJ must reduce power at night to 230 watts.  Programming is also heard on three FM translator stations: 92.7 W224AS in Washington, 104.7 W284AQ in Hackettstown and 105.7 W289CR in Glen Gardner.

Programming
WRNJ plays mostly adult contemporary music and classic hits from previous decades. The library includes hits from the 1980s to the present.

The station features world and national news from ABC News Radio at the beginning of every hour. Live local news airs after ABC News on weekdays from  6 a.m. to 7 p.m.  News Director Joyce Estey anchors the mornings, with Dave Kelber and Morgan Gardiner on afternoons and evenings.

The station's news staff received several awards for coverage in the wake of Hurricane Sandy in 2012. While the power was out, staff slept overnight at the station to keep providing updates to listeners.

FM translators
In addition to its main signal on 1510 AM, WRNJ broadcasts on the following FM translators:

The radio station can also be heard on the station's website and the TuneIn app.

History

Original 1510 Morris County license
The original station, known as WRAN (representing its location in RANdolph Township) had an unusual signal day and night. During the day the station transmitted at 10,000 watts, using a very directional signal resembling an hourglass. The station reached about 10 miles east and west but about 50 miles north and south.  Some places 30 miles away from WRAN's transmitter had a better signal than some points only 10 miles away. At night the station only put out 500 watts and reached about 10 miles all around.

1510 WRAN signed on the air on August 19, 1964, using a full service Contemporary Hits/Top 40 format.  It was licensed to Dover, New Jersey.  By the 1970s, the station switched to a hybrid format of adult contemporary, Top 40, and oldies.  Over time, the station moved closer to all oldies.  WRAN called itself "Solid Gold WRAN" at one point.  It was locally owned until 1980 when Sillerman and Morrow Broadcasting (owned by Cousin Brucie Morrow) purchased it, along with several other AM and FM radio stations in the New York City metropolitan area.

WRAN was upgraded with new equipment and the music was adjusted. But the Top 40/AC/Oldies hybrid format continued. Sillerman and Morrow sold WRAN along with their other stations to Bell Broadcasting in 1982. In 1984 WRAN was sold to Saddle River Holdings. The station was profitable under Cousin Brucie, but once he was no longer associated with WRAN, many advertisers pulled their commercials from the station.  WRAN continued on with an adult contemporary format until the spring of 1987. At that point the station switched to an oldies format using satellite programming most of the time.

The station at that point became WMHQ. Saddle River Holdings eventually put WMHQ up for sale in 1988, but no one was interested in the station. As a result, the station was taken dark and the license was returned to the FCC.  A website devoted to the history of the Dover station, which includes jingles, photos, and memorabilia, was created by a former employee, which has since been deleted by Xfinity.

AM 1000 license
WRNJ began operation on AM 1000 on August 26, 1976.  It was a daytime only station with no pre-sunrise or post-sunset authorization, except for local emergencies. WRNJ employed a full service adult contemporary format with an emphasis on local and national news.  WRNJ also had local talk shows featuring local leaders and volunteers. Larry Tighe originally owned the radio station.

For many years WRNJ was not profitable. By the early 1980s, there were rumors that the station may even go dark. At that point, Norman Worth, who was the only person selling a substantial amount of advertising, became sales manager. Months later the station began turning a profit. By the late 1980s, Worth became part owner of the station and took over as General Manager and eventually as Chief Operating Officer.

In 1992, Worth was awarded an FM license on 107.1 FM. That station became WRNJ-FM and aired a country music format. In 1996, WRNJ AM was granted a 24-hour license on 1510 kHz.  AM 1000 to Westinghouse Broadcasting, freeing the company to boost the power of its New York City AM station WINS 1010.  That year, WRNJ moved from AM 1000 to 1510.  It kept the Adult Contemporary format initially.  It also began operating from 5 a.m. to 10 p.m. daily.

In 1997, it was determined that the station's towers could not transmit the correct nighttime patterns. WRNJ reverted to daytime-only operation. The current music also was phased out and the station evolved to more of an oldies format. By 1998, it was known as "Oldies 1510 WRNJ". The station still continued to be profitable despite the daytime only operation.  At the same time, management sold the FM station at 107.1 MHz to Big City Radio. WRNJ-FM became WWYY and joined the Country Music Y 107 triplecast making that station a quadcast.  It switched to a Spanish-language tropical music format in 2002. In 2003 those stations were sold to Nassau and Nassau broke up the quadcast.  Today the station is licensed to Belvidere, but broadcasts from Stroudsburg. It simulcasts country station WCTO in Easton, Pennsylvania.

In 1999, Oldies 1510 WRNJ began 24-hour-a-day operations.  It aired satellite-delivered oldies programming for much of the day. But WRNJ retained its morning show, specialty shows, local news, and local talk shows. In 2004, WRNJ dropped the satellite programming.  It aired a full-service format that plays adult contemporary but talk shows were also featured.

The sale of WRNJ-FM in 1998 excluded the FM translators on 92.7 in Washington Township and on 104.7 in Hackettstown.  WRNJ's owners retained these to rebroadcast the AM signal.  In 2009, the oldies format evolved to a classic hits format focusing on 1970s and '80s hits. In 2014, the station returned to a mix of adult contemporary and classic hits, with the slogan "Today's Hits and Yesterday's Favorites."  The playlist was mostly from the '80s, '90s, and 2000s, but with a few titles from the '60s and '70s.

Notable air personalities
 Russ Long 
 Bernie Wagenblast 
 Deirdre Bryant (later with ABC News Radio) 
 Rob DiRienzo (later with WAGA-TV)
 Kevin Scholla
 Rick Adams (News) 
 Jim West
 Ken Griffin
 Bill Summers
 Jeff Grant
 David Kendall (1984 - 1986 at WRNJ-1000)
 Vince Santarelli (Morning Host 1983 - 1985)
 Jeff Yablon (The Computer Answer Guy - 1995-2000)
 Larry Daniels (Morning Host 1981-1983)
 Harlin Jeffries (Sports Director 2004-2012)
 Jay Edwards
 Mike Watterston
 Joyce Estey
 Dave Kelber
 Bert Baron
 Greta Latona
 Morgan Gardiner

References

External links
WRNJ Radio homepage

Radio stations established in 1976
1976 establishments in New Jersey
Hackettstown, New Jersey
RNJ
Mainstream adult contemporary radio stations in the United States